Percnostola is a genus of insectivorous passerine birds in the family Thamnophilidae.

The genus was erected by the German ornithologists Jean Cabanis and Ferdinand Heine in 1860. The type species is the black-headed antbird. The name of the genus comes from the Ancient Greek words perknos meaning "dark" or "dusky" and stolē meaning "dress" or "clothing".

The genus contains two species:
 Black-headed antbird (Percnostola rufifrons)
 Allpahuayo antbird (Percnostola arenarum)

The genus previously included the white-lined antbird but a genetic study published in 2013 found that it is embedded within Myrmoborus.

References

 
Bird genera
 
 
Taxonomy articles created by Polbot